Lapidia is a monotypic genus of flowering plants belonging to the family Asteraceae. The only species is Lapidia apicifolia.

The species is found in Northeastern Brazil.

References

Eupatorieae
Monotypic Asteraceae genera